Bulawayo Solid Waste Energy Plant, also Bulawayo Waste–To–Energy Plant, is a planned solid waste-fired thermal power plant in Bulawayo, the second-largest city in Zimbabwe. In the process, the plant will generate 11.35 MW of electricity".

Location
The power station would be located in Bulawayo, the second-largest city in the country.

Overview
The waste-to-energy project is under development, primarily to address the situation of excess sold waste in the city of Bulawayo. If and when completed, it will be one of a few waste-to-energy installations in sub-Saharan Africa. As of January 2022, one functional unit exists in Ethiopia,  and another, Kinshasa Thermal Power Station, is in the development phase, in the Democratic Republic of the Congo.

When fully constituted, the plant which will be developed in phases, is expected to process 352 tonnes of solid waste every day and convert it into electricity, diesel fuel, and biogas. The project also has the capability of producing manure from the organic component of the solid waste.

Developers
The development of the waste-to-energy installation is led by Pragma Leaf Consulting, an outfit based in the United Kingdom. Other joint venture partners include Geo Power, out of the Netherlands. The owner/developers have established an ad-hoc special vehicle company, Diverseflex Resources (Private) Limited which will own, design, fund, build and operate the energy complex.

Cost, funding and timetable
The development budget is reported as US$150 million. The consortium that owns the plant will operate it for 25 years after commissioning. The electricity generated by he plant will be sold to Zimbabwe Electricity Supply Authority (ZESA), for integration into the national grid.

See also 

 List of power stations in Zimbabwe
 Ayebo Biomass Power Station

References

External links
 is still keen on waste to energy plant As of 12 June 2019.

Power stations in Zimbabwe
Proposed power stations
Bulawayo